The Sukhumi Lighthouse is a lighthouse located in Sukhumi, Abkhazia (de jure a part of Georgia). The lighthouse was brought from Paris in 1861.

References

Lighthouses in Asia
Sukhumi
Buildings and structures in Abkhazia